Karl Ignaz Augustin Kohaut (Carolus Ignatius Augustinus; baptised August 26, 1726 – August 6, 1784) was an Austrian lutenist and composer of Czech descent. He is considered (along with Bernhard Joachim Hagen) to be one of the last important composers of music for Baroque Lute.

Born in Vienna, Karl Kohaut pursued a dual career as a diplomat and musician. He entered the Austrian civil service in 1756 or 1757 as a minor official in the state chancellery, but by 1778 he had reached the position of court secretary.

He was active as a violinist in performances organized by Gottfried van Swieten (in quartets by Haydn and Mozart), but he was most widely admired as a lutenist. He is recorded to have appeared as the soloist in a performance of one of his own lute concertos at the Tonkünstler-Societät on 17 March 1777, during which one of his symphonies was also performed.

Kohaut wrote seven lute concertos, which are fine examples of this rare genre. The concerto in F major is probably most well known, having been recorded at least four times: by Julian Bream, Alirio Díaz, John Schneiderman and Hopkinson Smith.  Kohaut's eight masses were frequently performed at the monasteries of Melk and Göttweig, especially the Missa Sancti Willibaldi, which was performed at Göttweig on 24 occasions, the last time as late as 1798. Kohaut's Symphony in F minor was his best known work during the 20th century, recorded on LP on the Supraphon label.

Works
Vocal: 
Applausus Mellicensis (cant.), perf. 1764, A-M;
8 masses, A-GÖ, M, CZ-Bm, Pnm

Orchestral: 
12 syms., A-M, CZ-Bu, Pnm;
7 lute concs., D-As, Bsb; Db Conc., A-Wgm, ed. D. Young (London, 1996)
1 double bass conc., DM

Chamber: 
3 divertimentos, lute, 2 vn, b, B-Br, D-As;
5 divertimentos, lute, B-Br; Sonata, lute, D-As;
7 trios, 1 for lute, vn, b, 6 for 2 vn, b, A-GÖ, M, Wgm, D-Bsb;
7 partitas, 2 vn, b, A-Wgm, Wn; Qt, 2 vn, va, b, Wn; Trio, fl, vn, b, D-Bsb;
1 sonata, lute solo, DM  
works listed in Breitkopf catalogues, 1762–3, 1766–7

Bibliography & references 
 FétisB
 GerberL
 GerberNL
 MGG1 (J. Klima)
 New Grove (David Young)
 J. A. Hiller, ed.: Wöchentliche Nachrichten und Anmerkungen die Musik betreffend, i (Leipzig, 1766)
 R. Freeman: The Practice of Music at Melk Monastery in the Eighteenth Century (diss., U. of California, 1971)
 J. Klima: ‘Karl Kohaut, der letzte Wiener Lautenist’, ÖMZ, xxvi (1971), 141–3 [with bibliography]

External links 

18th-century Austrian people
18th-century classical composers
18th-century Austrian male musicians
18th-century classical musicians
Austrian Baroque composers
Austrian Classical-period composers
Austrian lutenists
Czech classical composers
Czech male classical composers
Austrian male classical composers
Composers for lute
Austrian people of Czech descent
Musicians from Vienna
1726 births
1784 deaths